This is a list of places in Armenia which have standing links to local communities in other countries known as "town twinning" (usually in Europe) or "sister cities" (usually in the rest of the world).

A
Abovyan
 Villeurbanne, France

Akhtala
 Kobuleti, Georgia

Alaverdi

 Daugavpils, Latvia
 Kobuleti, Georgia
 Polotsk, Belarus

Armavir

 Allauch, France
 Armavir, Russia
 Feodosiya, Ukraine
 Shakhty, Russia

Artashat

 Clamart, France
 Pestszentlőrinc-Pestszentimre (Budapest), Hungary 

Artik
 Wodzisław Śląski, Poland

D
Dilijan

 Delijan, Iran
 Pyatigorsk, Russia
 Roman, Romania

G
Gavar
 Novorossiysk, Russia

Goris
 Vienne, France

Gyumri

 Ashfield, England, United Kingdom
 Białystok, Poland
 Córdoba, Argentina
 Créteil, France
 Domodedovo, Russia
 Glendale, United States
 Halle, Germany
 Mozdok, Russia
 Nardò, Italy
 Osasco, Brazil
 Petah Tikva, Israel
 Pitești, Romania
 Plovdiv, Bulgaria
 Xi'an, China

I
Ijevan

 Kostroma, Russia
 Valence, France

J
Jermuk

 Arkhangelsk, Russia
 Saint-Raphaël, France

K
Kapan
 Glendale, United States

O
Oshakan
 Alfortville, France

S
Sevan
 Grenoble, France

Sisian
 Montélimar, France

Spitak

 Limmen (Castricum), Netherlands
 Orsha, Belarus
 Samara, Russia

Stepanavan
 Décines-Charpieu, France

T
Talin
 Babruysk, Belarus

V
Vagharshapat

 Daugavpils, Latvia
 Fresno, United States

 Issy-les-Moulineaux, France
 Martakert, Azerbaijan
 Petrozavodsk, Russia
 Sergiyev Posad, Russia

Vanadzor

 Bagneux, France
 Batumi, Georgia
 Kislovodsk, Russia
 Pasadena, United States
 Maardu, Estonia
 Podolsk, Russia
 Vitebsk, Belarus
 Zhuzhou, China

Y
Yerevan

 Amman, Jordan
 Antananarivo, Madagascar
 Beirut, Lebanon
 Bratislava, Slovakia
 Buenos Aires, Argentina
 Cambridge, United States
 Carrara, Italy
 Chişinău, Moldova
 Damascus, Syria
 Isfahan, Iran
 Los Angeles, United States
 Marseille, France
 Montreal, Canada
 Nice, France
 Novosibirsk, Russia
 Odesa, Ukraine
 Riga, Latvia
 Rostov-on-Don, Russia
 São Paulo, Brazil
 Stavropol, Russia
 Tbilisi, Georgia
 Venice, Italy
 Volgograd, Russia

Yerevan – Davtashen
 Antony, France

References

Armenia
Armenia
Armenia geography-related lists
Foreign relations of Armenia
Populated places in Armenia